Douglas Leo Hayes (16 September 1896 – 5 June 1985) was an Australian rules footballer who played with Richmond in the Victorian Football League (VFL).

Notes

External links 

1896 births
1985 deaths
Australian rules footballers from Melbourne
Richmond Football Club players
Camberwell Football Club players
People from Richmond, Victoria